The 2008 RLIF Awards were presented on Monday 17 November 2008 at Suncorp Stadium, Brisbane, Australia recognising achievements in the sport of rugby league from October 2007 to October 2008 (including the NRL and Super League Grand Finals).

The 2008 RLIF Awards were marked by inaugural awards ceremony and featured new awards, notably the Rugby League International Federation Player of the Year Award. Other new awards included the Rookie of Year, for players who made their Test debut and were under 21 years of age in the awards year, the Nations' International Players of the Year, selected by each nation's governing body from the 19 teams that competed to qualify for the 2008 RLWC and the Spirit of Rugby League, for those who have made significant contributions to the sport in their lifetime.

Awards
For awards presented with nominees, winners are listed first and highlighted in boldface.

References

RLIF Awards
RLIF Awards
RLIF Awards